William B. "Bill" Caldwell IV (born January 24, 1954) is a retired United States Army officer and the current President of Georgia Military College.  Caldwell's final military assignment was as Commanding General of United States Army North, also known as the Fifth Army.

Education
Originally from Columbus, Georgia, Caldwell's family moved frequently as his father, William B. Caldwell, III was a serving officer in the US Army.  His father retired as a Lieutenant General while serving as the Commander of Fifth Army,  and he himself would eventually retire as a Lieutenant General while also serving as commander of Fifth US Army. During Caldwell's early childhood, his father was stationed at the United States Military Academy. Caldwell attended the SHAPE American High School at SHAPE, Belgium followed by Hargrave Military Academy, a private military boarding school in Chatham, Virginia. From there, he was accepted to the United States Military Academy at West Point, New York. He continued his education with a master's degree in systems technology from the Naval Postgraduate School and then a master of military arts and sciences from the School of Advanced Military Studies which is part of the U.S. Army Command and General Staff College. Caldwell has also attended the John F. Kennedy School of Government and Harvard University as a Senior Service College Fellow.

President of Georgia Military College 
General Caldwell has served as the President of Georgia Military College since November 1, 2013, during which time several new campuses were opened, growing the GMC footprint in Georgia to include the Main Campus in Milledgeville, 11 community college campuses, and the Global Online Leadership College.

Georgia Military College Preparatory School (K-12 grades) has also experienced growth under General Caldwell’s leadership, having added third grade in 2019, and grades K-2 in 2021. With the addition of the elementary grades, GMC Prep School also expanded its campus footprint with the historic preservation and restoration of Jenkins Hall, and now Wilder Hall, and new construction of the Prep School Annex. These buildings now house grades K- 5 in the Prep School.

Military career
Following a battalion command position in the 25th Infantry Division in Hawaii in the mid-1990s, Caldwell was sent to Haiti to work as political-military liaison in the U.S. Embassy during Operation Uphold Democracy.

After his tour in Haiti, he commanded the 1st Brigade, 10th Mountain Division, at Fort Drum, New York. He worked in the Office of the Director for Strategic Plans and Policy on the Joint Chiefs of Staff at the Pentagon, and later served as the executive assistant to the Chairman of the Joint Chiefs of Staff.

Caldwell was serving as deputy director for operations, U.S. Pacific Command, Hawaii, at the time of the 9/11 attacks, when  the command's focus shifted from regional war plans to the Global War on Terrorism.

In July 2002 Caldwell was assigned as senior military assistant to the deputy secretary of defense, Paul Wolfowitz. In this position he served his boss during the preparation, execution, and follow on for the Iraq War's Operation Iraqi Freedom and other aspects of the Global War on Terrorism.

From May 2004 until June 2006 Caldwell served as the Commanding General of the 82nd Airborne Division. As the division commander, Caldwell oversaw deployments by the units under his command to both Afghanistan and Iraq, as well as disaster-relief efforts following Hurricane Katrina in New Orleans.

Following his command of the 82nd, Caldwell was assigned as Deputy Chief of Staff for Strategic Effects and spokesperson for the Multi-National Force – Iraq, a position he held for 13 months.

United States Army Combined Arms Center

Caldwell was promoted to the rank of lieutenant general in June 2007 and served as the Commanding General of the Combined Arms Center at Fort Leavenworth, Kansas. As the Commanding General for the Combined Arms Center, he has responsibility for the Command and General Staff College and 17 other schools, centers, and training programs throughout the United States.

NATO Training Mission-Afghanistan/Combined Security Transition Command-Afghanistan
Caldwell assumed command of the NATO Training Mission-Afghanistan (NTM-A)/Combined Security Transition Command-Afghanistan (CSTC-A) on November 21, 2009. Prior to the activation of NTM-A at that time, CSTC-A was a two-star command headed by then Major General Richard Formica. Elevating the Afghan training mission to a three-star command reflected the increased priority placed on training the Afghan National Security Force (ANSF) as part of President Barack Obama's Afghan "Surge."  Caldwell's efforts in Afghanistan received praise from figures in the military and government, including Senator Carl Levin, United States Secretary of Defense Robert Gates, and Admiral Mike Mullen.

United States Army North (Fifth Army)
Caldwell's final military command was United States Army North, also known as the Fifth Army, which was also his father's final military assignment. Caldwell turned over command of U.S. Army North to Lieutenant General Perry L. Wiggins on September 4, 2013.

Dates of rank

Awards and decorations

Other awards

 Honorary ROCK of the Year in 2008

See also

 International Security Assistance Force
 Combined Security Transition Command – Afghanistan
 2009 congressional delegation to Afghanistan

Reference

1954 births
Living people
People from Columbus, Georgia
Military personnel from Georgia (U.S. state)
United States Army personnel of the Iraq War
United States Army personnel of the War in Afghanistan (2001–2021)
United States Army generals
Harvard Kennedy School alumni
United States Military Academy alumni
Commandants of the United States Army Command and General Staff College
Recipients of the Legion of Merit
Recipients of the Defense Superior Service Medal
Recipients of the Defense Distinguished Service Medal
Recipients of the Polish Army Medal
Recipients of the NATO Meritorious Service Medal
Recipients of the Homeland Security Distinguished Service Medal
Hargrave Military Academy alumni